Montecchio Emilia (Reggiano:  or ) is a comune (municipality) in the Province of Reggio Emilia in the Italian region Emilia-Romagna, located about  northwest of Bologna and about  west of Reggio Emilia.  
 
Montecchio Emilia borders the following municipalities: Bibbiano, Montechiarugolo, Cavriago, San Polo d'Enza, Sant'Ilario d'Enza. It is a largely industrial town located at nearly half the distance between Reggio and the other major nearby city, Parma.

History
In ancient times, it was called Monticulum, meaning "small mount" and referring to the hilly terrain formed by floods of the nearby river Enza. Traces of remains from as early as the Bronze Age (18th-17th centuries BC) have been found in the communal territory.

In the Middle Ages and early Modern times Montecchio (mentioned for the first time in a 781 diploma) was a fortified places contended between the Papal States, the Visconti of Milan, the Barbiano, the Sforza, the Gonzaga, the Farnese and then by Spain, France until, starting from the late Renaissance, it became part of the House of Este-held Duchy of Modena.

In 1859 it became part of the newly formed Italy as Montecchio Emilia.

Main sights
Church of San Donnino, built in Romanesque style in the 11th century but remade in 1596–1600.
Sanctuary of Beata Vergine dell'olmo, in Baroque style
Castle, mentioned for the first time in 1116 in a diploma by Matilde of Canossa.

External links
 Official website

Cities and towns in Emilia-Romagna